The 2004 Asian Men’s Club Volleyball Championship was the 5th staging of the AVC Club Championships. The tournament was held in Azadi Volleyball Hall, Tehran, Iran. Sanam of Iran won the tournament after beating Paykan of Iran.

Preliminary round

Pool A

|}

|}

Pool B

|}

|}

Classification 5th–7th

Semifinals

|}

5th place

|}

Final round

Semifinals

|}

3rd place

|}

Final

|}

Final standing

Awards
MVP:  Mohammad Torkashvand (Sanam)
Best Scorer:  Fang Yingchao (Shanghai)
Best Spiker:  Yevgeniy Senatorov (Atyrau)
Best Server:  Amir Hossein Monazzami (Sanam)
Best Blocker:  Saeid Rezaei (Paykan)
Best Receiver:  Azim Jazideh (Sanam)
Best Setter:  Amir Hosseini (Sanam)
Best Digger:  Azim Jazideh (Sanam)

References
Asian Volleyball Confederation
Club Sanam crowned kings of Asia
  Results

A
Asian volleyball club championships
V